Let's Switch! is a 1975 American made-for-television comedy film starring Barbara Eden and Barbara Feldon written by Peter Lefcourt and directed by Alan Rafkin. It premiered as the ABC Movie of the Week on January 7, 1975.

Plot
Lacy Colbert, a housewife, and her best friend Kate Fleming, a glamorous magazine editor, decide to switch lifestyles which creates chaos.

Cast
Barbara Eden as Lacy Colbert
Barbara Feldon as Kate Fleming
Richard Schaal as Ross Daniels
Pat Harrington Jr. as Randy Colbert
Penny Marshall as Alice Wright
Joyce Van Patten as Linette Robin
Ron Glass as LaRue Williams

External links

1975 television films
1975 films
1975 comedy films
American comedy television films
ABC Movie of the Week
Films directed by Alan Rafkin
1970s American films